The  (LMK) performed aircraft recognition during WWII, and a nuclear warning role from 1952, whilst retaining the aircraft recognition role due to the proximity of Warsaw Pact countries until 1991. The LMK was disbanded in 2004.

Cooperation with the Royal Observer Corps 
Following the Second World War, the Danish Home Guard sought to develop the LMK, and looked to an organisation with a similar role, the Royal Observer Corps (ROC) of the United Kingdom.

Aircraft recognition competitions between the LMK and ROC took place annually until 1991, despite the ROC no longer having an operational role of aircraft recognition. Honours remained roughly even over the history of the competitions, with the four man ROC team taking the trophy in the final contest.

Liaison visits were also organised between LMKHQ, located in the basement of the main Carlsberg brewery in Copenhagen, and ROCHQ, based at RAF Bentley Priory.

See also 
 Aircraft recognition
 Royal Observer Corps
 Aircraft Identity Corps (Canada)
 Volunteer Air Observers Corps (Australia)
 Ground Observer Corps (USA)
 Civil Air Patrol (USA)

References 

Military units and formations of Denmark
Ground-based air defence observation corps
Military units and formations established in 1952
Military units and formations disestablished in 2004